Beijing NO. 20 High School (Chinese: 北京市第二十中学 or 北京二十中学 or simply 二十中), is a public combined secondary school, providing both junior and senior stage secondary education. The school is in Qinghe, Haidian District of Beijing, one mile and a half from Shangdi, the Silicon Valley of China.

Beijing NO. 20 High School was founded in 1951, two years later than the foundation of the People's Republic of China. The high school was accredited as beacon high schools by Beijing Municipal Government in 2004.

The high school has two branch schools. One of them is Xindu Branch School, formerly Qinghe NO. 3 Middle School, merged into NO. 20 High School in 2005, which contains junior high school only. The other of them is Experimental School (Yongtai), a 9-year direct school with primary school and junior high school established in 2014.

The principal of the high school at present is Chen Henghua, and the Party secretary of the high school at present is Sun Yuzhu.

Notable alumni 
Zhou Yiwei, actor starring in Dying to Survive

Sister schools 
Ravenscroft School, North Carolina, the United States

Oaks Park High School, Ilford, London, the United Kingdom

Kapiti College, Raumati Beach, New Zealand

Mueller College, Brisbane, Australia

Ho Fung College, North Kwai Chung, New Territories, Hong Kong, China

References

External links 

 

High schools in Beijing
1951 establishments in China
Educational institutions established in 1951